The 1933 Kansas State Wildcats football team represented Kansas State University in the 1933 college football season.  The 1933 team finished 6–2–1 overall and they finished in second place in the Big Six Conference with a 4–1 conference record. The Kansas State team was led by future Hall-of-Fame coach Bo McMillin in his sixth and final season. The Wildcats played their home games in Memorial Stadium.  The Wildcats scored 105 points and gave up 29 points.

Schedule

References

Kansas State
Kansas State Wildcats football seasons
Kansas State Wildcats football